"Give Me All Night" is the second single from Carly Simon's 13th studio album Coming Around Again (1987). The song was co-written by Simon with Gerard McMahon and produced by Paul Samwell-Smith. An accompanying music video was filmed on Martha's Vineyard and featured drummer Rick Marotta.

The song is one of Simon's biggest Adult contemporary hits, and has been included on multiple compilations of her work, such as the three-disc box set Clouds in My Coffee (1995), the UK import The Very Best of Carly Simon: Nobody Does It Better (1998), the two-disc retrospective Anthology (2002), the single-disc Reflections: Carly Simon's Greatest Hits (2004), and Sony Music's Playlist: The Very Best of Carly Simon (2014). Simon also performed the song on her 1987 HBO concert special Live from Martha's Vineyard.

Reception
"Give Me All Night" peaked at No. 61 on the Billboard Hot 100, becoming Simon's 21st entry on this chart, where it spent 12 weeks. It was even more successful on Billboard Adult Contemporary chart, peaking at No. 5 and charting for 17 weeks. The song was a minor hit in Canada, and charted at No. 87. It also charted in South Africa, peaking at No. 14.

Cash Box called it a "gentle and richly melodic ballad."

Track listings and formats
7" single (US) 
 "Give Me All Night" – 3:56
 "Sleight Of Hand" – 3:26

7" single (UK)
 "Give Me All Night" – 4:02
 "Two Hot Girls (On A Hot Summer Night)" – 4:51

Personnel 
 Carly Simon – lead vocals, backing vocals 
 Peter-John Vettese – keyboards 
 Hugh McCracken – guitars 
 Tony Levin – bass
 Russ Kunkel – drums 
 Frank Filipetti – LinnDrum
 Jimmy Bralower – percussion

Charts

References

External links
Carly Simon's Official Website

1987 singles
Carly Simon songs
Songs written by Carly Simon
Pop ballads
1987 songs
Song recordings produced by Paul Samwell-Smith
Arista Records singles
Songs written by Gerard McMahon